Sri Sai University (SSU) is an private university located in Palampur, Kangra district, Himachal Pradesh. It was established in 2011.

References

External links
 

Private universities in India
Universities in Himachal Pradesh
Educational institutions established in 2011
2011 establishments in Himachal Pradesh
Education in Kangra district